DXSY is the callsign of Times Broadcasting Network Corporation's two flagship stations in Ozamiz: 

 DXSY-AM, branded as Radyo Bantay
 DXSY-FM, branded as Radyo Bisdak